During the 1942–43 season Hearts competed in the Southern League, the Summer Cup, the Southern League Cup and the East of Scotland Shield.

Fixtures

Friendlies

Rosebery Charity Cup

East of Scotland Shield

Southern League Cup

Summer Cup

Southern League

See also
List of Heart of Midlothian F.C. seasons

References

Statistical Record 42-43

External links
Official Club website

Heart of Midlothian F.C. seasons
Heart of Midlothian